The Bandit is an album by The Nashville String Band. The band consisted of Chet Atkins and Homer and Jethro.

Track listing

Side one 
 "The Bandit"
 "Estrellita"
 "Cielito Lindo"
 "Gay Ranchero" (J. J. Espinosa, Francia Luban)
 "Marcheta"
 "The Great El Tigre (The Tiger)"

Side two 
 "Spanish Eyes"
 "You Belong to My Heart"
 "Cumbanchero"
 "Bandera"
 "Vaya Con Dios"

Personnel 
Chet Atkins - guitar
Henry "Homer" Haynes - guitar
Kenneth "Jethro" Burns - mandolin
Strings arranged by Bill McElhiney

References

The Nashville String Band albums
1972 albums
Albums produced by Chet Atkins
RCA Victor albums